Rutherford railway station served the parish of Maxton, Roxburghshire, Scotland from 1851 to 1964 on the Kelso Line.

History 
The station opened in June 1851 by the North British Railway. It closed to both passengers and goods traffic on 15 June 1964.

References

External links 

Former North British Railway stations
Railway stations in Great Britain opened in 1851
Railway stations in Great Britain closed in 1964
1851 establishments in Scotland
1964 disestablishments in Scotland